Hauhonselkä is a lake in Finland. It is part of a chain of lakes that begins from the lakes Lummene and Vesijako at the drainage divide between the Kokemäenjoki and Kymijoki basins and flows westwards from there through the lakes Kuohijärvi, Kukkia, Iso-Roine, Hauhonselkä and Ilmoilanselkä and ends into lake Mallasvesi. The lake is located in the city of Hämeenlinna in the area of the former municipality of Hauho in the Tavastia Proper region and it is a part of the Kokemäenjoki basin.

See also
List of lakes in Finland

References
 Finnish Environment Institute: Lakes in Finland

Lakes of Hämeenlinna
Kokemäenjoki basin
Landforms of Kanta-Häme